Tyroane Joe Sandows (born 12 February 1995), commonly known as Ty Sandows or simply Ty, is a South African professional footballer who plays as a winger for Figueirense in the Série B.

Club career
On 25 September 2016, Tyroane made his professional debut with Grêmio in a 2016 Campeonato Brasileiro Série A match against Chapecoense. On 20 November, he assisted Miller Bolaños's goal in a 3–0 home victory against América Mineiro.

On 6 September 2017, after being released by Grêmio when his contract expired, he signed a two-year deal with Série B side Figueirense.

International career
He represented South Africa in the football competition at the 2016 Summer Olympics.

Personal life
Tyroane was born in Johannesburg. He moved to São Paulo in 2006 to pursue a professional football career.

Career statistics

Honours

Club
Grêmio
Copa do Brasil: 2016

References

External links

1995 births
Living people
Soccer players from Johannesburg
South African soccer players
Association football forwards
São Paulo FC players
Grêmio Foot-Ball Porto Alegrense players
Campeonato Brasileiro Série A players
Footballers at the 2016 Summer Olympics
Olympic soccer players of South Africa